The 2018–19 Pittsburgh Penguins season was the 52nd season for the National Hockey League team that was established on June 5, 1967. The Penguins clinched a playoff spot on April 4, 2019, after a 4–1 win against the Detroit Red Wings.

The Penguins qualified for the 2019 Stanley Cup playoffs, where they were swept in the first round by the New York Islanders.

Standings

Schedule and results

Preseason
The preseason schedule was released on June 15, 2018.

|- style="background:#fcf;"
| 1 || September 18 || Pittsburgh || 2–3 || Buffalo || KeyBank Center || 15,602 || 0–1–0
|- style="background:#ffc;"
| 2 || September 19 || Pittsburgh || 2–3  || Detroit || Little Caesars Arena || 15,107 || 0–1–1
|- style="background:#cfc;"
| 3 || September 22 || Columbus || 3–7 || Pittsburgh || PPG Paints Arena || 17,190 || 1–1–1
|- style="background:#fcf;"
| 4 || September 23 || Detroit || 3–2 || Pittsburgh || PPG Paints Arena || 18,306 || 1–2–1
|- style="background:#cfc;"
| 5 || September 26 || Buffalo || 1–5 || Pittsburgh || PPG Paints Arena || 16,516 || 2–2–1
|- style="background:#fcf;"
| 6 || September 28 || Pittsburgh || 6–7 || Columbus || Nationwide Arena || 13,976 || 2–3–1
|-

|- style="text-align:center;"
| Legend:       = Win       = Loss       = OT/SO Loss

Regular season
The regular season schedule was published on June 21, 2018.

|- style="background:#cfc;"
| 1 || October 4 || Washington || 6–7  || Pittsburgh || PPG Paints Arena || 18,627 || 1–0–0 || 2
|- style="background:#fcf;"
| 2 || October 6 || Montreal || 5–1 || Pittsburgh || PPG Paints Arena || 18,622 || 1–1–0 || 2
|- style="background:#cfc;"
| 3 || October 11 || Vegas || 2–4 || Pittsburgh || PPG Paints Arena || 18,610 || 2–1–0 || 4
|- style="background:#ffc;"
| 4 || October 13 || Pittsburgh || 3–4  || Montreal || Bell Centre || 21,302 || 2–1–1 || 5
|- style="background:#ffc;"
| 5 || October 16 || Vancouver || 3–2  || Pittsburgh || PPG Paints Arena || 18,492 || 2–1–2 || 6
|- style="background:#cfc;"
| 6 || October 18 || Pittsburgh || 3–0 || Toronto || Scotiabank Arena || 19,483 || 3–1–2 || 8
|- style="background:#cfc;"
| 7 || October 23 || Pittsburgh || 6–5  || Edmonton || Rogers Place || 18,347 || 4–1–2 || 10 
|- style="background:#cfc;"
| 8 || October 25 || Pittsburgh ||  9–1 || Calgary || Scotiabank Saddledome || 17,834 || 5–1–2 || 12
|- style="background:#cfc;"
| 9 || October 27 || Pittsburgh || 5–0 || Vancouver || Rogers Arena || 17,537 || 6–1–2 || 14
|- style="background:#fcf;"
| 10 || October 30 || NY Islanders || 6–3 || Pittsburgh || PPG Paints Arena || 18,509 || 6–2–2 || 14  
|-

|- style="background:#ffc;"
| 11 || November 1 || Pittsburgh || 2–3  || NY Islanders || Barclays Center || 10,910 || 6–2–3 || 15
|- style="background:#fcf;"
| 12 || November 3 || Toronto || 5–0 || Pittsburgh || PPG Paints Arena || 18,638 || 6–3–3 || 15
|- style="background:#fcf;"
| 13 || November 5 || New Jersey || 5–1 || Pittsburgh || PPG Paints Arena || 18,420 || 6–4–3 || 15 
|- style="background:#fcf;"
| 14 || November 7 || Pittsburgh || 1–2 || Washington || Capital One Arena || 18,506 || 6–5–3 || 15
|- style="background:#cfc;"
| 15 || November 10 || Arizona || 0–4 || Pittsburgh || PPG Paints Arena || 18,596 || 7–5–3 || 17
|- style="background:#fcf;"
| 16 || November 13 || Pittsburgh || 2–4  || New Jersey || Prudential Center || 15,108 || 7–6–3 || 17 
|- style="background:#fcf;"
| 17 || November 15 || Tampa Bay || 4–3 || Pittsburgh || PPG Paints Arena || 18,422 || 7–7–3 || 17 
|- style="background:#fcf;"
| 18 || November 17 || Pittsburgh || 4–6 || Ottawa || Canadian Tire Centre || 17,692 || 7–8–3 || 17
|- style="background:#ffc;"
| 19 || November 19 || Buffalo || 5–4  || Pittsburgh || PPG Paints Arena || 18,618 || 7–8–4 || 18
|- style="background:#cfc;"
| 20 || November 21 || Dallas || 1–5 || Pittsburgh || PPG Paints Arena || 18,340 || 8–8–4 || 20
|- style="background:#ffc;"
| 21 || November 23 || Pittsburgh || 1–2  || Boston || TD Garden || 17,565 || 8–8–5 || 21
|- style="background:#cfc;"
| 22 || November 24 || Columbus || 2–4 || Pittsburgh || PPG Paints Arena || 18,602 || 9–8–5 || 23
|- style="background:#cfc;"
| 23 || November 27 || Pittsburgh || 4–3 || Winnipeg || Bell MTS Place || 15,321 || 10–8–5 || 25
|- style="background:#fcf;"
| 24 || November 28 || Pittsburgh || 3–6 || Colorado || Pepsi Center || 17,348 || 10–9–5 || 25 
|-

|- style="background:#fcf;"
| 25 || December 1 || Philadelphia || 4–2 || Pittsburgh || PPG Paints Arena || 18,653 || 10–10–5 || 25 
|- style="background:#cfc;"
| 26 || December 4 || Colorado || 3–6 || Pittsburgh || PPG Paints Arena || 18,415 || 11–10–5 || 27
|- style="background:#cfc;"
| 27 || December 6 || NY Islanders || 2–6 || Pittsburgh || PPG Paints Arena || 18,440 || 12–10–5 || 29
|- style="background:#ffc;"
| 28 || December 8 || Pittsburgh || 1–2  || Ottawa || Canadian Tire Centre || 15,795 || 12–10–6 || 30
|- style="background:#cfc;"
| 29 || December 10 || Pittsburgh || 2–1  || NY Islanders || Nassau Coliseum || 13,917 || 13–10–6 || 32
|- style="background:#fcf;"
| 30 || December 12 || Pittsburgh || 3–6 || Chicago || United Center || 21,232 || 13–11–6 || 32
|- style="background:#cfc;"
| 31 || December 14 || Boston || 3–5 || Pittsburgh || PPG Paints Arena || 18,549 || 14–11–6 || 34 
|- style="background:#cfc;"
| 32 || December 15 || Los Angeles || 3–4  || Pittsburgh || PPG Paints Arena || 18,627 || 15–11–6 || 36
|- style="background:#fcf;"
| 33 || December 17 || Anaheim || 4–2 || Pittsburgh || PPG Paints Arena || 18,575 || 15–12–6 || 36 
|- style="background:#cfc;"
| 34 || December 19 || Pittsburgh || 2–1 || Washington || Capital One Arena || 18,506 || 16–12–6 || 38
|- style="background:#cfc;"
| 35 || December 20 || Minnesota || 1–2 || Pittsburgh || PPG Paints Arena || 18,435 || 17–12–6 || 40 
|- style="background:#cfc;"
| 36 || December 22 || Pittsburgh || 3–0 || Carolina || PNC Arena || 16,264 || 18–12–6 || 42
|- style="background:#cfc;"
| 37 || December 27 || Detroit || 2–5 || Pittsburgh || PPG Paints Arena || 18,639 || 19–12–6 || 44
|- style="background:#cfc;"
| 38 || December 29 || Pittsburgh || 6–1 || St. Louis || Enterprise Center || 17,475 || 20–12–6 || 46
|- style="background:#cfc;"
| 39 || December 31 || Pittsburgh || 3–2 || Minnesota || Xcel Energy Center || 19,163 || 21–12–6 || 48
|-

|- style="background:#cfc;"
| 40 || January 2 || Pittsburgh || 7–2 || NY Rangers || Madison Square Garden || 18,006 || 22–12–6 || 50
|- style="background:#cfc;"
| 41 || January 4 || Winnipeg || 0–4 || Pittsburgh || PPG Paints Arena || 18,642 || 23–12–6 || 52
|- style="background:#fcf;"
| 42 || January 6 || Chicago || 5–3 || Pittsburgh || PPG Paints Arena || 18,623 || 23–13–6 || 52
|- style="background:#cfc;"
| 43 || January 8 || Florida || 1–5 || Pittsburgh || PPG Paints Arena || 18,526 || 24–13–6 || 54
|- style="background:#cfc;"
| 44 || January 11 || Pittsburgh || 7–4 || Anaheim || Honda Center || 17,473 || 25–13–6 || 56
|- style="background:#fcf;"
| 45 || January 12 || Pittsburgh || 2–5 || Los Angeles || Staples Center || 18,414 || 25–14–6 || 56 
|- style="background:#fcf;"
| 46 || January 15 || Pittsburgh || 2–5 || San Jose || SAP Center || 17,292 || 25–15–6 || 56 
|- style="background:#cfc;"
| 47 || January 18 || Pittsburgh || 3–2  || Arizona || Gila River Arena || 14,757 || 26–15–6 || 58 
|- style="background:#fcf;"
| 48 || January 19 || Pittsburgh || 3–7 || Vegas || T-Mobile Arena || 18,511 || 26–16–6 || 58
|- style="background:#fcf;"
| 49 || January 28 || New Jersey || 6–3 || Pittsburgh || PPG Paints Arena || 18,609 || 26–17–6 || 58
|- style="background:#cfc;"
| 50 || January 30 || Tampa Bay || 2–4 || Pittsburgh || PPG Paints Arena || 18,514 || 27–17–6 || 60
|-

|- style="background:#cfc;"
| 51 || February 1 || Ottawa || 3–5 || Pittsburgh || PPG Paints Arena || 18,618 || 28–17–6 || 62
|- style="background:#fcf;"
| 52 || February 2 || Pittsburgh || 2–3 || Toronto || Scotiabank Arena || 19,477 || 28–18–6 || 62 
|- style="background:#fcf;"
| 53 || February 5 || Carolina || 4–0 || Pittsburgh || PPG Paints Arena || 18,435 || 28–19–6 || 62
|- style="background:#ffc;"
| 54 || February 7 || Pittsburgh || 2–3  || Florida || BB&T Center || 14,712 || 28–19–7 || 63
|- style="background:#fcf;"
| 55 || February 9 || Pittsburgh || 4–5 || Tampa Bay || Amalie Arena || 19,092 || 28–20–7 || 63
|- style="background:#cfc;"
| 56 || February 11 || Pittsburgh || 4–1 || Philadelphia || Wells Fargo Center || 19,103 || 29–20–7 || 65 
|- style="background:#cfc;"
| 57 || February 13 || Edmonton || 1–3 || Pittsburgh || PPG Paints Arena || 18,750 || 30–20–7 || 67 
|- style="background:#fcf;"
| 58 || February 16 || Calgary || 5–4 || Pittsburgh || PPG Paints Arena || 18,667 || 30–21–7 || 67 
|- style="background:#cfc;"
| 59 || February 17 || NY Rangers || 5–6 || Pittsburgh || PPG Paints Arena || 18,646 || 31–21–7 || 69 
|- style="background:#cfc;"
| 60 || February 19 || Pittsburgh || 4–3 || New Jersey || Prudential Center || 15,824 || 32–21–7 || 71
|- style="background:#fcf;"
| 61 || February 21 || San Jose || 4–0 || Pittsburgh || PPG Paints Arena || 18,362 || 32–22–7 || 71
|- style="background:#ffc;"
| 62 || February 23 || Pittsburgh || 3–4  || Philadelphia || Lincoln Financial Field || 69,620(outdoors) || 32–22–8 || 72 
|- style="background:#cfc;"
| 63 || February 26 || Pittsburgh || 5–2 || Columbus || Nationwide Arena || 18,776 || 33–22–8 || 74
|-

|- style="background:#ffc;"
| 64 || March 1 || Pittsburgh || 3–4  || Buffalo || KeyBank Center || 19,070 || 33–22–9 || 75
|- style="background:#cfc;"
| 65 || March 2 || Pittsburgh || 5–1 || Montreal || Bell Centre || 21,302 || 34–22–9 || 77
|- style="background:#cfc;"
| 66 || March 5 || Florida || 2–3  || Pittsburgh || PPG Paints Arena || 18,484 || 35–22–9 || 79
|- style="background:#cfc;"
| 67 || March 7 || Columbus || 0–3 || Pittsburgh || PPG Paints Arena || 18,611 || 36–22–9 || 81
|- style="background:#fcf;"
| 68 || March 9 || Pittsburgh || 1–4 || Columbus || Nationwide Arena || 19,146 || 36–23–9 || 81
|- style="background:#cfc;"
| 69 || March 10 || Boston || 2–4 || Pittsburgh || PPG Paints Arena || 18,578 || 37–23–9 || 83
|- style="background:#cfc;"
| 70 || March 12 || Washington || 3–5 || Pittsburgh || PPG Paints Arena || 18,640 || 38–23–9 || 85
|- style="background:#cfc;"
| 71 ||  March 14 || Pittsburgh || 5–0 || Buffalo || KeyBank Arena || 18,680 || 39–23–9 || 87
|- style="background:#fcf;"
| 72 || March 16 || St. Louis || 5–1 || Pittsburgh || PPG Paints Arena || 18,641 || 39–24–9 || 87
|- style="background:#ffc;"
| 73 || March 17 || Philadelphia || 2–1  || Pittsburgh || PPG Paints Arena || 18,636 || 39–24–10 || 88
|- style="background:#ffc;"
| 74 || March 19 || Pittsburgh || 2–3  || Carolina || PNC Arena || 14,677 || 39–24–11 || 89 
|- style="background:#cfc;"
| 75 || March 21 || Pittsburgh || 2–1  || Nashville || Bridgestone Arena || 17,729 || 40–24–11 || 91 
|- style="background:#cfc;"
| 76 || March 23 || Pittsburgh || 3–2 || Dallas || American Airlines Center || 18,532 || 41–24–11 || 93 
|- style="background:#cfc;"
| 77 || March 25 || Pittsburgh || 5–2 || NY Rangers || Madison Square Garden || 17,401 || 42–24–11 || 95 
|- style="background:#fcf;"
| 78 || March 29 || Nashville || 3–1 || Pittsburgh || PPG Paints Arena || 18,632 || 42–25–11 || 95
|- style="background:#cfc;"
| 79 || March 31 || Carolina || 1–3 || Pittsburgh || PPG Paints Arena || 18,616 || 43–25–11 || 97
|-

|- style="background:#fcf;"
| 80 || April 2 || Pittsburgh || 1–4 || Detroit || Little Caesars Arena || 19,515 || 43–26–11 || 97 
|- style="background:#cfc;"
| 81 || April 4 || Detroit || 1–4 || Pittsburgh || PPG Paints Arena || 18,574 || 44–26–11 || 99
|- style="background:#ffc;"
| 82 || April 6 || NY Rangers || 4–3  || Pittsburgh || PPG Paints Arena || 18,660 || 44–26–12 || 100
|-

|- style="text-align:center;"
| Legend:       = Win       = Loss       = OT/SO Loss

Detailed records
Final

Playoffs

The Penguins faced the New York Islanders in the First Round of the playoffs, where they were swept in four games.

Game log

|- style="background:#fcf;"
| 1 || April 10 || Pittsburgh || 3–4 || NY Islanders || OT || Murray || 13,917 || 0–1 || Recap
|- style="background:#fcf;"
| 2 || April 12 || Pittsburgh || 1–3 || NY Islanders || || Murray || 13,917 || 0–2 || Recap
|- style="background:#fcf;"
| 3 || April 14 || NY Islanders || 4–1 || Pittsburgh || || Murray || 18,610 || 0–3 || Recap 
|- style="background:#fcf;"
| 4 || April 16 || NY Islanders || 3–1 || Pittsburgh || || Murray || 18,609 || 0–4 || Recap 
|-

|-
| Legend:       = Win       = Loss       = Playoff series win

Player statistics
Final

Skaters

Goaltenders

†Denotes player spent time with another team before joining the Penguins. Stats reflect time with the Penguins only.
‡Denotes player was traded mid-season. Stats reflect time with the Penguins only.
Bold/italics denotes franchise record.

Awards and honours

Milestones

Transactions
The Penguins have been involved in the following transactions during the 2018–19 season.

Trades

Free agents

Waivers

Signings

Retirement

Contract terminations

Notes
  – Two-way contract
  – Entry-level contract

Draft picks

Below are the Pittsburgh Penguins' selections at the 2018 NHL Entry Draft, which was held on June 22 and 23, 2018, at the American Airlines Center in Dallas, Texas.

Notes:
  The Nashville Predators' second-round pick went to the Pittsburgh Penguins as the result of a trade on June 23, 2018, that sent Ottawa's third-round pick and a fifth-round pick both in 2018 (64th and 146th overall) to Colorado in exchange for this pick.
  The Detroit Red Wings' fifth-round pick went to the Pittsburgh Penguins as the result of a trade on October 21, 2017, that sent Scott Wilson and a third-round pick in 2018 to Detroit in exchange for Riley Sheahan and this pick.

References

Pittsburgh Penguins seasons
Pittsburgh Penguins
Penguins
Penguins